The 2016 PDC Unicorn World Youth Championship was the sixth edition of the PDC World Youth Championship, a tournament organised by the Professional Darts Corporation for darts players aged between 16 and 23.

The knock-out stages from the last 64 to the semi-finals were played in Wigan on 16 October 2016. The final took place on 27 November 2016, before the final of the 2016 Players Championship Finals, which was shown live on ITV4.

Max Hopp was the defending champion after defeating Nathan Aspinall 6–5 in the 2015 final, but he lost in the second round to fellow German Martin Schindler.

The final was contested between Dutch player Berry van Peer and Australia's Corey Cadby, with Cadby winning 6–2.

Prize money

Qualification

The tournament will feature 64 players. The top 46 players in the PDC Development Tour Order of Merit automatically qualify for the tournament, with the top eight players being seeded. They were originally joined by 17 international qualifiers, but the Gibraltar qualifier Clayton Otton withdrew. Participation would also be possible for any age-qualified players from the top 32 of the main PDC Order of Merit, but the eligible player Benito van de Pas turned down his place, so the remaining two qualifying places were granted to the Junior Darts Corporation's European Champion, Jim Moston, and their number one ranked player, John Brown.

Should an international qualifier also be ranked high enough in the Development Tour Order of Merit to qualify, further places would be allocated from the Development Tour Order of Merit.

The participants are:

1-48 

International qualifiers
  Avery Bozzetti
  Corey Cadby
  Chris Coulter
  Jack Faragher
  Liam Gallagher
  Fabian Herz 
  Robbie King
  Aaron Knox
  Anton Kolesov
  Dongju Lee
  Nico Mandl
  Jaime Nunez
  Clayton Otton (withdrew)
  Martin Schindler
  Kay Smeets
  Justin van Tergouw
  Zong Xiao Chen

Age-qualified players from the top 32 of the PDC Order of Merit
  Benito van de Pas (withdrew)

Alternates from the Junior Darts Corporation
  Jim Moston
  John Brown

Draw

References

World Youth Championship
PDC World Youth Championship
2016